A radio documentary is a spoken word radio format devoted to non-fiction narrative. It is broadcast on radio as well as distributed through media such as tape, CD, and podcast. A radio documentary, or feature, covers a topic in depth from one or more perspectives, often featuring interviews, commentary, and sound pictures. A radio feature may include original music compositions and creative sound design or can resemble traditional journalistic radio reporting, but cover an issue in greater depth.

History

Origins 
The early stages of fiction audio storytelling did not entirely resemble what would later be called radio documentaries. In the 1930s, with radio stations like WNYC entering the airspace, reporters documented real people and real-life scenarios through short on-the-ground interviews rather than dramatization. Other notable documentary broadcasts include unrefined one-shot audio recordings of events, such as the Hindenburg disaster in 1937. By 1939, CBS responded to growing anxieties about immigration in the U.S. with a six-month series, titled "Americans All…Immigrants All," which highlighted the stories of immigrant communities.

The lack of documentary-style reporting in this era can be attributed, in part, to technological limitations; recording equipment was not easily portable.

1940s 
An important moment in the establishment of the radio documentary as a widely used and discussed format is the expansion of portable audio recording devices. In 1945, sound archivist and radio producer, Tony Schwartz began to use portable audio recording equipment to collect the sounds of his neighborhood in New York City to share on his WNYC radio show; his features ran for 30 years and grew to include the sounds of daily life recorded by and mailed to him from people around the world. This style of sharing true-life sound bytes would remain in public radio documentary.

In 1946, one of the most pivotal developments in the spread and stylization of radio documentary was the creation of the CBS Documentary Unit. It was the first sector of a major media network dedicated to this format of radio. The unit was "'devoted exclusively to the production of programs dealing with major domestic and international issues and involving extraordinary research and preparation'". Not only did the content deviate from programming that favors advertisers, the style deviated from the standard, creating a well-known format. The style of reporting for the CBS features was adopted and melded by ABC and NBC networks. The format included extensive interviews to gain multiple perspectives on an issue, adherence to journalistic ethics, and often a call to action; the programming was usually released as multiple segments and at peak times. Examples of these first documentary projects include CBS' 1946 war feature, The Empty Noose, and ABC's 1949 program, V.D., A Conspiracy of Silence, addressing the lack of public attention to venereal disease.

1970s 
With the founding of National Public Radio in 1971, radio documentary began shifting again due to non-commercial educational media. For a short time, programs such as All Things Considered explored creative styles of presenting non-fiction by deviating from now-traditional styles of radio documentary by hiring reporters outside of the radio sphere.

1990s-present 
Important shifts in technology have allowed radio documentary to travel beyond analog. With the advent of podcasting and internet radio, the FCC provides no guidelines for these media. Programs are allowed to skirt FCC regulation, marking yet another shift in the content and style of documentary programming. Current features that exemplify the new possibilities opened by podcasting include the often gritty subject matter of Love + Radio and the critical success of the podcast Serial due to the ability of listeners across the globe to access the content for free.

Quotes

Radio documentary in developing nations

There has been tremendous interest in the field of radio documentaries, particularly in developing nations such as India, Iran, South Korea and Malaysia. In India, for example, radio documentary is gaining in popularity due to their flexibility, efficiency and accessibility to the masses. Producers such as Chitra Narain and Danish Iqbal have been accredited with its revival and popularity in the region. Danish Iqbal who is primarily a drama producer combined the elements of dramatic narrative to produce some memorable radio documentaries. His documentary "Yeh Rishta Kya Kehlata Hai'' is considered a classic for the use of effective narrative and ambient sounds. This documentary presents an account of unseen bridges between a Kashmiri Shikarah Wala and his auto rickshaw driver friend in Delhi. Although they never met each other their unseen bond is the subject of this rare Documentary which transcends the barriers of political, religious and regional prejudices.

Because both Chitra and Danish had a long tenure at Delhi and had a creative collaboration with many media institutes, their influence is seminal in shaping the thinking of many of their students and co-workers. Danish won twice the prestigious Public Service Broadcasting Award for his documentaries.

Notable feature makers

References

 
Documentaries